Niyi Osundare is a leading African poet, dramatist, linguist, and literary critic. Born on March 12, 1947, in Ikere-Ekiti, Nigeria, his poetry is influenced by the oral poetry of his Yoruba culture, which he capaciously hybridizes with other poetic traditions of the world, including African American, Latin American, Asian, and European.
 
Osundare is a champion of free speech and his creative and critical writings are closely associated with political activism, decolonization, black internationalism, and the environment. He is the recipient of numerous prizes, including the Association of Nigerian Authors (ANA) Poetry Prize, the Commonwealth Poetry Prize, the Tchicaya U Tam'si Poetry Prize, and the ANA/Cadbury Poetry Prize (twice). In 1991, Osundare became the first Anglophone African poet to win the Noma Award (Africa's most prestigious book award), and in 1998, he was awarded the Fonlon/Nichols Prize for his "excellence in literary creativity combined with significant contributions to Human Rights in Africa." In 2014, he was admitted to the National Order of Merit, his country's highest honor for intellectual distinction and creative achievement. Osundare is Emeritus Distinguished Professor of English at the University of New Orleans.

Family and education 
Osundare gained degrees in English at the University of Ibadan (BA), the University of Leeds (MA), and York University, Canada (PhD, 1979). Previously professor (from 1989) and Head of English (1993–97) at the University of Ibadan, he became professor of English at the University of New Orleans in 1997. Osundare has a wife, Kemi, and three children, two girls and a son who still lives in Nigeria. His deaf daughter is the reason Niyi settled in the United States. She could not go to school in Nigeria so they found a school in the U.S. for her, and moved so as to be closer to her. He has been used in many schools as an example of a poet.

Career 
He has always been a vehement champion of the right to free speech and is a strong believer in the power of words, saying, "to utter is to alter". Osundare is renowned for his commitment to socially relevant art and artistic activism and has written several open letters to the former President of Nigeria (Olusegun Obasanjo), whom Osundare has often publicly criticised.

Osundare believes that there is no choice for an African poet but to be political:"You cannot keep quiet about the situation in the kind of countries we find ourselves in, in Africa.  When you wake up and there is no running water, when you have a massive power outage for days and nights, no food on the table, no hospital for the sick, no peace of mind; when the image of the ruler you see everywhere is that of a dictator with a gun in his hand; and, on the international level, when you live in a world in which your continent is consigned to the margin, a world in which the colour of your skin is a constant disadvantage, everywhere you go – then there is no other way than to write about this, in an attempt to change the situation for the better."

Under the rule of the dictator General Sani Abacha (1993–98), Osundare regularly contributed poems to a Nigerian national newspaper (now part of the collection Songs of the Season) that criticised the regime and commented upon the lives of people in Nigeria. As a result, he was frequently visited by security agents and asked to explain his poems and to whom they referred:"By that time I realized that the Nigerian security apparatus had become quite 'sophisticated', quite 'literate' indeed!""A couple of my students at the University of Ibadan had become informers; a few even came to my classes wired. And when I was reading abroad, someone trailed me from city to city. At home, my letters were frequently intercepted."

In 1997, he accepted a teaching and research post at the University of New Orleans. In 2005 Osundare was caught in Hurricane Katrina, and he and his wife were stuck in their attic for 26 hours. Their neighbour, who at the time was driving by in his boat, heard their shouts for help. They were rescued and bounced around from rescue shelters until they ended up in Rindge, New Hampshire, where Osundare could get a teaching job as a professor at Franklin Pierce College and things settled down.

Honors and recognition 
Osundare is a holder of numerous awards for his poetry, as well as the Fonlon/Nichols award for "excellence in literary creativity combined with significant contributions to Human Rights in Africa".

His 60th birthday literary fete took place at venues in Ikere-Ekiti, Ibadan and Lagos state of Nigeria in March 2007.

His poem "Not My Business" is compulsory study in the AQA A syllabus for General Certificate of Secondary Education English Language.

In 2011, an Associate Professor of English at The University of Lagos, Christopher Anyokwu, wrote an article on Niyi Osundare's Poetry and the Yoruba World View, where he analysed the use of Indigenous Yoruba concepts found in Niyi Osundare's texts. The associate professor, went further to assume that Osundare unified in his work the concepts and traditions of Yoruba culture and Marxist ideology.

In December 2014, Osundare was awarded the Nigerian National Merit Award for academic excellence.

Literary prizes and awards 
 First Prize, Western State of Nigeria Poetry Competition (1968)
 1981 Major Book Prize and Letter of Commendation, BBC Poetry Competition (1981)
 Honorable Mention, Noma Award for Publishing in Africa (1986)
 Honorable Mention, Noma Award for Publishing in Africa (1989)
Association of Nigerian Authors (ANA) Poetry Prize (1986)
 Joint-Winner, Overall Commonwealth Poetry Prize (1986)
 Kwanza Award (1991)
 Noma Award for Publishing in Africa (the first Anglophone African poet to receive the award) (1991)
 Cadbury/ANA Poetry Prize (Nigeria’s highest poetry prize). Also won the maiden edition in 1989 (1994)
 Fonlon/Nichols Prize for "Excellence in Literary Creativity Combined with Significant Contributions to Human Rights in Africa"; African Literature Association (ALA)’s most distinguished award) (1998)
 The Spectrum Books Award to The Eye of the Earth as “One of Nigeria’s Best 25 Books in the Last 25 Years” (2004)
 The Tchicaya U Tam'si Prize for African Poetry (regarded as Africa's highest poetry prize) (2008)
Nigerian National Order of Merit Award (Nigeria's highest award for academic excellence) (2014)

Publications 
 Songs from the Marketplace (1983)-
 Village Voices (1984)-
 The Eye of the Earth (1986, winner of a Commonwealth Poetry Prize and the poetry prize of the Association of Nigerian Authors)-
 Moonsongs (1988)-
 Songs of the Season (1999)-
 Waiting Laughters (1990, winner of the Noma Award)-
 Selected Poems (1992)-
 Midlife (1993)-
 Thread in the Loom: Essays on African Literature and Culture (2002)-
 The Word is an Egg (2002)-
 The State Visit (2002, play)-
 Pages from the Book of the Sun: New and Selected Poems (2002)-
 Early Birds (2004)-
 Two Plays (2005)- 
 The Emerging Perspectives on Niyi Osundare (2003)-
 Not My Business (2005)-
 Tender Moments:Love Poems (2006)-
 City Without People: The Katrina Poems (2011)-
 Random Blues (2011)-

Documentary
In 2016, Osundare, along with his lifelong friend, the Sierra Leonean poet Syl Cheney-Coker, was the subject of a documentary called The Poets, by director Chivas DeVinck. The film follows Osundare and Cheney-Coker on a road-trip through Sierra Leone and Nigeria as they discuss their friendship and how their life experiences have shaped their art.

References

Relevant literature
 Ayinuola, Fortress Isaiah, and Onwuka Edwin. "Yoruba eco-proverbs in English: An eco-critical study of Niyi Osundare’s midlife and horses of memory." Journal of Literary Society of Nigeria 6 (2014): 29-40.

External links
 Niyi Osundare at the University of New Orleans
 "I am a Humanist": An Interview with Niyi Osundare
 After Katrina, Nigerian Poet Starts New Life in New England (VOA News): Niyi Osundare survives Hurricane Katrina
 Kọ́lá Túbọ̀ṣún, Review of  Niyi Osundare: A Literary Biography by Sule E. Egya. Brittle Paper, 9 October 2017.

People from Ekiti State
University of Ibadan alumni
Alumni of the University of Leeds
York University alumni
Academic staff of the University of Ibadan
Nigerian poets
University of New Orleans faculty
Yoruba poets
Nigerian literary critics
Living people
1947 births
20th-century Nigerian writers
21st-century Nigerian writers
English-language writers from Nigeria
Yoruba academics
Nigerian expatriate academics in the United States
International Writing Program alumni
Recipients of the Nigerian National Order of Merit Award